Shiloh Thomas Fernandez (born February 26, 1985) is an American actor. He is known for his roles in the television series Jericho and United States of Tara, and the films Deadgirl, Red Riding Hood, and the 2013 remake of Evil Dead.

Early life
Fernandez was born in Ukiah, California. His father is of half Portuguese and half Russian Jewish descent, whereas his mother has British ancestry. He has a younger sister and a brother. His stepfather is a contractor. Before becoming an actor, Fernandez began working as a dishwasher, and an American Apparel catalog model hand-picked by the company's CEO, Dov Charney, for his then-fledgling company. Later arriving in Los Angeles, he asked Charney for a job and was hired as a stock boy. His first acting gig was a commercial for First 5 California that was directed by Vadim Perelman.

Career

2006–10: early work
After completing a short film, Fernandez made his debut television appearance in a 2006 episode of Cold Case, followed by minor roles in Drake & Josh and Lincoln Heights. His screen debut came two years later, in 2007, when he landed the role of Edgar in Interstate before returning to TV. He landed his first recurring role in Jericho as Sean Henthorn between 2006 and 2007. The series was cancelled after just one season before a campaign by fans saw it return for a second before being cancelled once again.

In 2008, Fernandez became one of the front-runners to play Edward Cullen after he auditioned for Catherine Hardwicke in her Venice Beach garage, during the casting of Twilight. Fernandez was allegedly Hardwicke's first choice, but it was up to Kristen Stewart who had the last say. Shiloh later recalled on his narrowly missed opportunity, "At the time, it was just another audition. I didn't realize I was missing out on stardom and giant paychecks. Now, looking back on it, I certainly wouldn't have been mentally stable enough to deal with all that. Lucky for me, not getting that part led to other work that was a much better fit for me." Fernandez, who had no formal training, admitted being bashful around other actors during rehearsals.  Having done an array of television shows (CSI: NY, The United States of Tara) including starring in the Gossip Girl episode "Valley Girls" as Owen Campos, alongside Brittany Snow and Krysten Ritter. He eventually landed his first big break playing a troubled small-town Texas rink manager in the 2010 Sundance hit Skateland with Twilight alum Ashley Greene.

2011–present: breakthrough
Though he lost the Twilight role to Robert Pattinson, Hardwicke liked Fernandez enough to cast him in what would be his first romantic lead, in Red Riding Hood, opposite Amanda Seyfried. The role became his Hollywood movie breakthrough, making him a hot commodity. MTV Networks' NextMovie.com named him one of the 'Breakout Stars to Watch for in 2011'. As he shot into the spotlight, he was the cover model of Nylon Guys''' March 2011 issue, introducing him as "Hollywood's New Rebel", and was the cover man for the April/May 2011 issue of Da Man magazine.

In 2013, Fernandez starred in the remake of Evil Dead and in the independent film Syrup, based on the novel of the same name by Max Barry. In March 2015, Fernandez earned one of the leading roles in the Canadian thriller film Edge of Winter, who will star along Rossif Sutherland, Joel Kinnaman, Tom Holland, Percy Hynes-White and Rachelle Lefevre.

Personal life
His favorite movie of all time is The Thing Called Love'' and River Phoenix is his idol. Fernandez has stated that if he were not acting, he would have majored in Spanish, moved to South America, and run a banana farm or worked in construction, because he is good with his hands; or, if he was better at it, a writer. Fernandez has an affinity for country music, and his dream role is to play a country music star. He is a friend of actor Thomas Dekker.

Filmography

References

External links

 
 Official website

1985 births
21st-century American male actors
American male film actors
Male models from California
American male television actors
American people of Portuguese descent
Living people
Male actors from California
People from Ukiah, California
American people of Russian-Jewish descent
American people of British descent